The Austro was made in Austria from 1913 to 1914. It was one of few cyclecars produced in Central Europe. Powered by a 6 horsepower NSU engine, it had a 4-speed gearbox and double chain final drive. It had an independent front suspension, using sliding pillars on the lines of the Morgan.  Austro cyclecars did well in mountain trials, as well as the Semmering Hill Climbs. Austro also manufactured aeroplanes.

References
^ "Austro", in G.N. Georgano, ed., The Complete Encyclopedia of Motorcars 1885-1968  (New York: E.P. Dutton and Co., 1974).

svvs.org Classic, Vintage and Veteran Cars

Cyclecars